Alix Collombon (born 17 March 1993) is a French former tennis player and professional padel player.

Her highest career singles ranking is world No. 457, achieved on 9 June 2014. The best career singles ranking is No. 646, achieved on 27 October 2014. 

She received a wild card into the doubles main draw in the 2014 French Open. 2021, she made history by becoming the first French woman to reach a World Padel Tour final. She made it at the Lerma Challenger alongside Spain's Jessica Castelló. However, they lost 0-6 and 5-7 in the final. Two weeks later, they were in the final again, this time at the La Nucia Challenger, and won 6-1 and 6-3, becoming the first Frenchwomen to win a World Padel Tour title.

ITF finals

Singles (0–2)

Doubles (0–1)

References

External links
 
 
 

1993 births
Living people
French female tennis players
Female tennis players playing padel
Place of birth missing (living people)